DXGL (88.7 FM), broadcasting as 88.7 Real Radio, is a radio station owned and operated by PEC Broadcasting Corporation. It serves as the flagship station of Real Radio network. The station's studio is located at PECBC Broadcast Center, Capitol-Bonbon Rd., Imadejas Subdivision, Butuan.

References

Radio stations in Butuan
Radio stations established in 1988